Thomas Wilson Crothers,  (January 1, 1850 – December 10, 1921) was a Canadian politician.

Born in Northport, Canada West, he was a lawyer and teacher before being elected to the House of Commons of Canada for the Ontario riding of Elgin West in the 1908 federal election. A Conservative, he was re-elected in 1911 and as a Unionist in 1917. From 1911 to 1918, he was the Minister of Labour. In October 1921, he was appointed to the Senate of Canada representing the senatorial division of Ontario. He died in office just two months later in December 1921.

References
 

1850 births
1921 deaths
Canadian senators from Ontario
Conservative Party of Canada (1867–1942) MPs
Conservative Party of Canada (1867–1942) senators
Members of the House of Commons of Canada from Ontario
Members of the King's Privy Council for Canada
Unionist Party (Canada) MPs
People from Prince Edward County, Ontario